Posaconazole, sold under the brand name Noxafil among others, is a triazole antifungal medication.

It was approved for medical use in the United States in September 2006, and is available as a generic medication.

Medical uses
Posaconazole is used to treat invasive Aspergillus and Candida infections. It is also used for the treatment of oropharyngeal candidiasis (OPC), including OPC refractory to itraconazole and/or fluconazole therapy.

It is also used to treat invasive infections by Candida, Mucor, and Aspergillus species in severely immunocompromised patients.

Clinical evidence for its utility in treatment of invasive disease caused by Fusarium species (fusariosis) is limited.

It appears to be helpful in a mouse model of naegleriasis.

Pharmacology

Pharmacodynamics
Posaconazole works by disrupting the close packing of acyl chains of phospholipids, impairing the functions of certain membrane-bound enzyme systems such as ATPase and enzymes of the electron transport system, thus inhibiting growth of the fungi. It does this by blocking the synthesis of ergosterol by inhibiting of the enzyme lanosterol 14α-demethylase and accumulation of methylated sterol precursors. Posaconazole is significantly more potent at inhibiting 14-alpha demethylase than itraconazole.

Microbiology
Posaconazole is active against the following microorganisms:
 Candida spp.
 Aspergillus  spp.
 Zygomycetes spp.

Pharmacokinetics
Posaconazole is absorbed within three to five hours. It is predominantly eliminated through the liver, and has a half-life of about 35 hours. Oral administration of posaconazole taken with a high-fat meal exceeds 90% bioavailability and increases the concentration by four times compared to fasting state.

References

External links
 
 

1,2,4-Triazol-3-ones
27-Hydroxylase inhibitors
CYP3A4 inhibitors
Fluoroarenes
Lanosterol 14α-demethylase inhibitors
Merck & Co. brands
Orphan drugs
Para-Methoxyphenylpiperazines
Phenylethanolamine ethers
Schering-Plough brands
Secondary alcohols
Tetrahydrofurans
Triazole antifungals
Ureas